Disney Media may refer to:

 Disney Media and Entertainment Distribution, a business segment of the Walt Disney Company
 Disney Media Networks (original division), a former business segment of the Walt Disney Company